Rafael Forster (born 23 July 1990) is a Brazilian professional footballer who plays as a defender for CSA. Mainly a central defender, he can also play as a left-back.

Club career
Born in São José, Santa Catarina, Rafael Forster was an Internacional youth graduate. On 1 March 2010 he was loaned to Náutico, making his senior debuts in that year's Campeonato Pernambucano.

After representing Audax São Paulo and Audax Rio de Janeiro, Rafael Forster signed for Brasil de Pelotas on 12 March 2013. After impressing with the latter, he joined Goiás on 20 April 2015.

Rafael Forster made his Série A debut on 10 May, starting in a 0–0 away draw against Vasco.

On 30 August 2017, Forster signed with Bulgarian champions Ludogorets Razgrad.

Honours
Ludogorets
Bulgarian First League (3): 2017–18, 2018–19, 2019–20
Bulgarian Supercup (2): 2018, 2019

References

External links

1990 births
Living people
Sportspeople from Santa Catarina (state)
Brazilian footballers
Association football defenders
Campeonato Brasileiro Série A players
Campeonato Brasileiro Série D players
Sport Club Internacional players
Clube Náutico Capibaribe players
Grêmio Osasco Audax Esporte Clube players
Audax Rio de Janeiro Esporte Clube players
Grêmio Esportivo Brasil players
Goiás Esporte Clube players
Ukrainian Premier League players
FC Zorya Luhansk players
First Professional Football League (Bulgaria) players
PFC Ludogorets Razgrad II players
PFC Ludogorets Razgrad players
Botafogo de Futebol e Regatas players
Esporte Clube Juventude players
Brazilian expatriate footballers
Brazilian expatriate sportspeople in Ukraine
Brazilian expatriate sportspeople in Bulgaria
Expatriate footballers in Ukraine
Expatriate footballers in Bulgaria

Brazilian people of German descent